Triuris hyalina is a species in genus Triuris.  It is a tiny flowering plant no more than a few cm tall, lacking chlorophyll and obtaining its nutrients from fungi in the soil. It is known from Brazil, Suriname, Guyana, Colombia, Venezuela.

References

External links
Photos and description 

Triuridaceae
Parasitic plants
Flora of South America
Plants described in 1841